Triangular ligament may refer to:

Left triangular ligament of the liver (ligamentum triangulare sinistrum hepatis)
Right triangular ligament of the liver (ligamentum triangulare dextrum hepatis)
Urogenital diaphragm (Diaphragma urogenitale), a layer of the pelvis